Betty Jean Alexander (born  1966) is an American politician, who served as a Democratic member of the Michigan Senate, representing the 5th district from 2019 to 2022.

Alexander was described as a dark horse candidate due to her never holding public office, her being a single mother, and qualifying for food stamps before her election to the state senate. Alexander serves as a member of the Michigan Legislative Black Caucus.

References

External links 
 Official Website

Living people
1960s births
African-American women in politics
Politicians from Detroit
African-American state legislators in Michigan
Women state legislators in Michigan
Democratic Party Michigan state senators
21st-century American politicians
21st-century American women politicians
21st-century African-American women
21st-century African-American politicians
20th-century African-American people
20th-century African-American women